Audible is a 2021 American short documentary film made for Netflix and directed by Matthew Ogens. It was nominated for Best Documentary Short at the 94th Academy Awards.

Summary
It follows Maryland School for the Deaf senior athlete Amaree McKenstry-Hall and his teammates' journey to defend their winning streak, while simultaneously coping with the tragic loss of a close friend to suicide.

The documentary documents other students at school's campus in Frederick, Maryland and McKenstry-Hall's personal life. In 2020 McKenstry-Hall completed his studies at MSD.

Release and reception
The film was released on July 1, 2021, and received a nomination for Best Documentary Short Subject at the 94th Academy Awards.

References

Further media

External links 
 
 
 

2021 films
2021 short documentary films
Documentary films about American football
Documentary films about suicide
American short documentary films
Documentary films about deaf people
English-language Netflix original films
2020s English-language films
2020s American films